Aster yomena (syn. Kalimeris yomena), the kalimeris or Japanese aster, is a species of flowering plant in the family Asteraceae, native to Korea and Japan. Locals occasionally collect its young leaves and cook them as a leaf vegetable.

There are a number of ornamental cultivars under its synonym Kalimeris yomena, with the variegated 'Shogun' being widely commercially available.

Subtaxa
The following varieties are accepted:
Aster yomena var. angustifolius  – Japan
Aster yomena var. yomena – Korea, Japan

References

yomena
Garden plants of Asia
Flora of Korea
Flora of Japan
Plants described in 1938